Kazimir Tarman (born 4 March 1930) is a Slovene professor of Animal Ecology, author of many scientific and popular science books on ecology.

In 1975, he won the Levstik Award for his book Zakaj, zato v ekologiji (Questions and Answers in Ecology).

Selected bibliography

 Povest o hrbtenici (The Story of the Spinal Cord), with Miroslav Zei, 1999
 Osnove ekologije in ekologija živali (The Basics in Ecology and the Ecology of Animals), 1992
 Naša rodna zemlja: Živali tal (Our Home Ground: Animals of the Soil), 1985
 Biologija: višje ravni organizacije : ekosistemi (Biology: Higher Organizational Levels: Ecosystems), 1982
 Zakaj, zato v ekologiji (Questions and Answers in Ecology), 1975
 Humifikacija tal, s posebnim ozirom na Kras (Humification of the Soil in particular respect to the Karst), 1967
 Živi svet prsti (The Living World of Soil), 1965
 Človek in narava (Man and Nature), 1964

References 

1930 births
Living people
Slovenian zoologists
Levstik Award laureates
People from Maribor